Andrew Marshall may refer to:

Entertainment and media
Andrew Marshall (screenwriter) (born 1954), British comedy screenwriter
Andrew Marshall (journalist), British journalist and radio presenter
Andrew Marshall (Asia journalist) (born 1967), British journalist specialising in South East Asia
Andrew MacGregor Marshall (born 1971), Scottish journalist and writer

Sports
Andrew Marshall (American football) (1879–1965), American football player
Andrew Marshall (Canadian football) (born 1990), Canadian football player
Andrew Marshall (golfer) (born 1973), English professional golfer
Andrew Marshall (soccer) (born 1984), American footballer

Others
Andrew Marshall (foreign policy strategist) (1921–2019), American foreign policy strategist

See also
Andy Marshall (born 1975), English football goalkeeper
Drew Marshall (born 1966), Canadian radio presenter